Argentera is a comune (municipality) in the Province of Cuneo in the Italian region Piedmont, located about  southwest of Turin and about  west of Cuneo, on the border with France. It consists of a series of sparse hamlets in the upper Valle Stura di Demonte. The municipal seat is in Bersezio, on the road to the Maddalena Pass.

Argentera borders the following municipalities: Acceglio, Canosio, Larche (France), Pietraporzio, and Saint-Etienne-de-Tinée (France).

References

Cities and towns in Piedmont